National Highway 230 (NH 230), also known as Kisan Path and Lucknow outer ring road is a  National Highway in India. Lucknow outer ring road is an 8 lane (4 each side) 104 km long under construction road project.

Status updates
 Mar 2019: 15 km of the road project was completed and inaugurated.
 May 2020: Work on rest of road project progressing. 
 Oct 2020: Outer ring road to be ready by December 2021.
 Oct 2021: work on remaining 76 kms of outer ring road is progressing and is expected to be completed by June 2022.
 Feb 2022: After six months the ring road is ready, the work is going on very fast. Earthworks from Agra Expressway to Hardoi Road have almost been completed.

See also
 List of National Highways in India

References

National Highways in Uttar Pradesh
Transport in Lucknow